Liv i luckan med julkalendern ("Action with the Christmas Calendar"), also known as Julklådan ("Christmas Itch"), was the Sveriges Television's Christmas calendar in 1988.

This year, TV presenter Staffan Ling presented short Christmas stories, based by screenplays submitted by children.

References

External links 
 

1988 Swedish television series debuts
1988 Swedish television series endings
Sveriges Television's Christmas calendar